KDGL-LD, virtual UHF and digital channel 23, is a low-powered Cozi TV-affiliated television station serving Southwest Kansas and the Oklahoma Panhandle that is licensed to Sublette, Kansas. The station is owned by High Plains Broadcasting. KDGL has sister stations in Dodge City, Garden City, Liberal, and Ulysses.  This forms a continuous coverage of over 90 miles radius from Sublette, Kansas. FCC service contours indicate that KDGL and its sister stations cover approximately 156,350 people.  Actual people covered is estimated to be 204,000+ with 74,000+ households with the 2010 census using the Longley-Rice model.

Purpose 
KDGL was formed to provide local news, weather, sports, and community events to the Southwest Region of the State of Kansas as well as much of the Oklahoma Panhandle.  High Plains Today is produced every weekday at noon.

Location 
KDGL is located in an old AT&T microwave radio tower on the South edge of Sublette, Kansas.

Facilities 
Currently KDGL is operating a completely digital SD-SDI master control plant.  MPEG2 Encoding and Multiplexing is accomplished with a Motorola TMX-2010 system.  Automation software is from Deyan Automation Systems in Cyprus.  Traffic and Billing software is Natural Log 8.  Live events are streamed over the internet or private backhauls to the station's master control plant with a Streambox ACT-L3.  Video is stored in a 15 disk Fibre Channel disk array with 16 channels of playback and 8 channels of record via 4 Leitch Nexio MPEG2/DV25 servers.  The on-air weather graphics system for severe weather graphics was written by the station.  The on-air or studio control room is 100% SD-SDI.  Graphics are done with a dual channel SDI Chyron Corporation Duet SD character generator running Lyric.  Switching is done with a BlackMagic ATEM 15 channel switcher.

Studio 
KDGL is utilizing existing building space in the 22 x 78 building.  The studio is 15 x 20.

Digital channels
The station's digital signal is multiplexed:

Translators

References 

Low-power television stations in the United States